The 1961 Ball State Cardinals football team was an American football team that represented Ball State College (later renamed Ball State University) in the Indiana Collegiate Conference (ICC) during the 1961 NCAA College Division football season. In its sixth season under head coach Jim Freeman, the team compiled a 2–5–1 record and finished in a three-way tie for fourth place out of seven teams in the ICC.

Schedule

References

Ball State
Ball State Cardinals football seasons
Ball State Cardinals football